Larysa Klochkova (born 15 April 1970) is a Ukrainian Paralympic volleyball player.

Klochkova won a bronze medal at the 2012 Paralympic Games games in the women's team event. She also competed at the in 2008 and 2016 Paralympic Games.

References

1970 births
Living people
Place of birth missing (living people)
Paralympic volleyball players of Ukraine
Ukrainian sitting volleyball players
Women's sitting volleyball players
Paralympic bronze medalists for Ukraine
Volleyball players at the 2008 Summer Paralympics
Volleyball players at the 2012 Summer Paralympics
Volleyball players at the 2016 Summer Paralympics
Medalists at the 2012 Summer Paralympics
Paralympic medalists in volleyball